Ainārs Juškēvičs (born 13 July 1981 in Riga, Latvian SSR)  is a professional Latvian floorball player.

References

1981 births
Living people
Latvian floorball players
Sportspeople from Riga